The Everitt was an American automobile manufactured from 1909 until 1912 by the Metzger Motor Car Company in Detroit.

History
This company was founded by B F Everitt and W E Metzger with money they received from Studebaker when leaving the E-M-F Company in June, 1909. Chief engineer was William S. Kelly, who previously was responsible for the Wayne and E-M-F cars.

The car, a 30 hp four with a so-called "thiefproof" gear lever lock, was also built in Canada as the Tudhope. It was  very similar to the E-M-F Thirty, and was produced without much mechanical changes through the whole time the company was active. The planned production run for the first model year was sold before actual building had begun. This Four-30 was joined by a larger Four-36 in 1911. Most sources name the engine in both series the same, so, the difference was in the longer wheelbase of the ladder car. One source gives a higher HP rating, but this would inevitably have changed its volume, as the A.L.A.M. rating is calculated from cylinder bore.

In 1912, a 6 cylinder model Six-48 was also offered, which at $1850 appears as a good buy.

When the last of the E-M-F founders, W E Flanders, also joined in 1913, the company was reorganized as the Flanders Motor Company. The only model offered was the improved 6 cylinder car, which got electric starter and lights, and a new name, Flanders Six-50. Both, car and new company, lasted only a few months. There is no connection to the Flanders Twenty built by E-M-F from 1910 until 1912.

Model overview

See also
 Brass Era car
 List of defunct United States automobile manufacturers

References

Sources
 Beverly Rae Kimes (editor), Henry Austin Clark Jr.: Standard catalog of American Cars. 1805–1942. Digital Edition. 3rd ed. Krause Publications, Iola 2013, p. 552–553.
 G. N. Georgano (editor): Complete Encyclopedia of Motorcars, 1885 to the Present.  New York: Dutton Press, 2nd edition (Hardcover) 1973,  
 Beverly Rae Kimes: Pioneers, Engineers, and Scoundrels: The Dawn of the Automobile in America. editor SAE (Society of Automotive Engineers) Permissions, Warrendale PA 2005,  
 Robert D. Dluhy: American Automobiles of the Brass Era: Essential Specifications of 4,000+ Gasoline Powered Passenger Cars, 1906-1915, with a Statistical and Historical Overview. Mcfarland & Co Inc. publishers, Jefferson NC, 2013; .

External links 
 "The E-M-F Automobile Homepage"

Defunct motor vehicle manufacturers of the United States
Motor vehicle manufacturers based in Michigan
Defunct companies based in Michigan
Brass Era vehicles
Companies based in Detroit
1909 establishments in Michigan
1912 disestablishments in Michigan